Lyubechane is a village (selo) in Russia, located in Klimovsky District, Bryansk Oblast.

Geography 
The village is located in southwestern Bryansk Oblast, in the Polesian Lowland. It is near to Russia's state border with Ukraine.

History 
In March 2023, during the Russian invasion of Ukraine, armed men identifying themselves as the Russian Volunteer Corps, a Russian partisan group, crossed the border from Ukraine and attacked Lyubechane.

Demographics 
From 2010 to 2013, the population of the settlement decreased from 264 to 236.

According to the 2002 Russian census, Russians made up 93% of the population, which at the time was 343.

References 

Populated places in Klimovsky District